Durpata is a mountain of the Garhwal Himalaya in Uttarakhand India. It is situated in the Kamet range. It is 93rd highest located entirely within the Uttrakhand. Nanda Devi, is the highest mountain in this category. It lies 3.8 km east of Gauri Parbat  its nearest higher neighbor. Hathi Parbat  lies 4.8 km SW and it is 5.1 km SSE of Rataban . It lies 11.7 km SSE of Nilgiri Parbat .

Climbing history
It was first climbed by Andre Roch and Sherpa Gombu in 1939 during a Swiss climbing party. On 16th August they climbed a glacier and followed a ridge on the south-east slope between two summits. they found a large partially frozen tarn at 21,000 feet Mounting some couloirs they soon attained a snowy ridge to the top. They descended after building a small cairn and back in camp in 2 hours.

Neighboring and subsidiary peaks
Neighboring or subsidiary peaks of Durpata:
 Gauri Parbat 
 Rataban 
 Nilgiri Parbat 
 Hathi Parbat

Glaciers and rivers
It was surrounded by Ratabon Glacier on the northern side and Kosa Glacier on the southern side. Both the glacier merge them self and drains down to Dhauliganga River near Malari. Later Dhauli ganga met with Alaknanda at Vishnuprayag. Alaknanda River is one of the main tributaries of river Ganga that later joins Bhagirathi River the other main tributaries of river Ganga at Devprayag and became Ganga there after.

See also

 List of Himalayan peaks of Uttarakhand

References

Mountains of Uttarakhand
Six-thousanders of the Himalayas
Geography of Chamoli district